Close Enough for Jazz is an album by vibraphonist Johnny Lytle recorded in 1969 and originally issued on the Solid State label.

Reception
The Allmusic review by Craig Lytle states "Johnny Lytle was always true to his vibes. In other words, the passion he had for playing his music through his vibes was ever so present on each outing. This album is no different".

Track listing
All compositions by Johnny Lytle except as indicated
 "Tenderly" (Walter Gross, Jack Lawrence) - 3:03
 "Just a Little Bit of Holiness" - 2:44
 "Gwink" - 3:40
 "Embraceable You" (George Gershwin, Ira Gershwin) - 3:55
 "At Last" (Mack Gordon, Harry Warren) - 2:47
 "Close Enough for Jazz" - 4:40
 "Agapee/Polemos" - 6:28
 "Baby, You Make Me Feel So Good" - 4:55

Personnel
Johnny Lytle - vibraphone, xylophone
Billy Nunn - organ
Paul West - bass
Josell Carter - drums
Lawrence Killian - congas
Marcel Lytle - vocals (track 8)

References

Solid State Records (jazz label) albums
Johnny Lytle albums
1969 albums
Albums produced by Sonny Lester